The 1933 Miami Redskins football team was an American football team that represented Miami University as a member of the Buckeye Athletic Association (BAA) during the 1933 college football season. In its second season under head coach Frank Wilton, Miami compiled a 7–2 record (4–1 against conference opponents) and tied for the BAA championship.

Schedule

References

Miami
Miami RedHawks football seasons
Miami Redskins football